For the 1959 Vuelta a España, the field consisted of 90 riders; 41 finished the race.

By rider

References

1959 Vuelta a España
1959